The 1966 New Mexico State Aggies football team was an American football team that represented New Mexico State University as an independent during the 1966 NCAA University Division football season. In their ninth year under head coach Warren B. Woodson, the Aggies compiled a 7–3 record and outscored opponents by a total of 321 to 159. The team played its four home games at Memorial Stadium in Las Cruces, New Mexico.

The team's statistical leaders included quarterback Sal Olivas with 1,154 passing yards, running back Jim Bohl with 1,148 rushing yards, and Mike Carroll with 431 receiving yards.

Schedule

References

New Mexico State Aggies
New Mexico State Aggies football seasons
New Mexico State Aggies football